Patri may refer to:
a genus of spiders in the family Oonopidae, with the sole species Patri david
Patri (footballer) (born 1977), Spanish footballer
"Gloria Patri", a Christian hymn

People with the surname
Angelo Patri (1876–1965), Italian author
Giacomo Patri (1898–1978), Italian artist
Purnendu Patri (1931–1997), Bengali writer and film director
Héctor Patri (born 1956), Argentine boxer

People with the given name
Patri Fidiel (1762–1824), Maltese Capuchin
Patri Friedman (born 1976), American political theorist
Patri Satish Kumar (born 1970), Indian Carnatic musician
Patri J. Pugliese (1950–2007), American historian
Patri Vergara (born 1955), Spanish physiology professor

See also
Pater (disambiguation)